Niedźwiedź or Niedzwiedz is a Polish language surname from the Polish word for bear. Notable people with the name include:
 Agnieszka Niedźwiedź (1995), Polish former mixed martial artist
 Iwona Niedźwiedź (1979), Polish former handball player
 Janusz Niedźwiedź (1982), Polish football manager and former player
 Klaus Niedzwiedz (1951), former professional race driver and motoring journalist

References 

Polish-language surnames
Surnames from nicknames